Perquenco is a town and commune in the Cautín Province of southern Chile's Araucanía Region. The town was declared capital of the unrecognized Kingdom of Araucanía and Patagonia by Orélie-Antoine de Tounens, but soon after it was occupied by Cornelio Saavedra Rodríguez who was in charge of the Chilean occupation of the Araucanía.

Demographics
Of these, 2,929 (45.4%) lived in urban areas and 3,521 (54.6%) in rural areas. The population grew by 9.6% (564 persons) between the 1992 and 2002 censuses.

Administration
As a commune, Perquenco is a third-level administrative division of Chile administered by a municipal council, headed by an alcalde who is directly elected every four years. The 2008-2012 alcalde is Luis Alberto Muñoz Pérez (PDC).

Within the electoral divisions of Chile, Perquenco is represented in the Chamber of Deputies by Enrique Estay (UDI) and Fuad Chahín (PDC) as part of the 49th electoral district, together with Victoria, Curacautín, Lonquimay, Melipeuco, Vilcún, Lautaro and Galvarino. The commune is represented in the Senate by Alberto Espina Otero (RN) and Jaime Quintana Leal (PPD) as part of the 14th senatorial constituency (Araucanía-North).

References

External links
  Municipality of Perquenco

Communes of Chile
Populated places established in 1894
Capitals of former nations
Populated places in Cautín Province